The Loch of Hundland is a shallow freshwater loch in the parish of Birsay in the north west of the mainland of Orkney, Scotland. The loch lies between the larger lochs of Swannay and Boardhouse and acts as the main water catchment for Loch of Boardhouse. It has a great variety of aquatic plants including species that are unusual locally and nationally, and many types of birds including waders, gulls, larks and ducks that nest or use the loch. It is also popular for trout fishing.

The loch was surveyed in 1906 by James Murray and later charted as part of the Bathymetrical Survey of Fresh-Water Lochs of Scotland 1897-1909.

References

Hundland
Hundland
Hundland
Mainland, Orkney